János Gálicz (1890–1939), better known as "General Gal", was a Hungarian and Soviet brigade and division commander during the Spanish Civil War.

Biography 
Born in 1890 in the town of Tótkomlós in Austria-Hungary (now Békés county in Hungary).

As part of the Austro-Hungarian army, he participated in the First World War. During his service on Eastern Front he fell into Russian captivity. After the October Revolution he joined the Red Army and took part in the Russian Civil War.

He rained at the Frunze Military Academy in Moscow and was promoted to the rank colonel. In 1936 he was sent to Spain and fought in the International Brigades in the Spanish Civil War under the assumed name of José Ivanovich Gal.

He planned and ordered an attack in the hills above the Jarama River which led to what was described by Ernest Hemingway as the decimation of the Twelfth International Brigade.  After his return to the Soviet Union he was arrested during the Great Purge and presumably shot sometime in 1939, in Moscow.

1890 births
1939 deaths
People from Tótkomlós
People from the Kingdom of Hungary
Austro-Hungarian military personnel of World War I
Hungarian people of the Spanish Civil War
Great Purge victims from Hungary
International Brigades personnel
Soviet people of Hungarian descent
Soviet military personnel
Soviet military personnel of the Russian Civil War
Soviet people of the Spanish Civil War
Hungarian communists
Communist Party of the Soviet Union members